The Southeastern Conference Player of the Year is a baseball award given to the Southeastern Conference's most outstanding player. The award was first given following the 1993 season, with both pitchers and position players eligible. After the 2003 season, the Southeastern Conference Baseball Pitcher of the Year award was created to honor the most outstanding pitcher. It is selected by the league's head coaches, who are not allowed to vote for their own players.

The award has been shared twice, once by Stephen Head of Ole Miss and Jon Zeringue of LSU in 2004, and once by Dylan Crews of LSU and Sonny DiChiara of Auburn. Only one player has won the award twice—Matt LaPorta of Florida in 2005 and 2007. LSU has the most all-time winners, with six. One SEC member has yet to have a winner: 2012 arrival Missouri.

Key

Winners

Winners by school

References

Awards established in 1993
Player
NCAA Division I baseball conference players of the year